Badie Ovnteni (born 1967) is a former Nigerien flyweight boxer. Ovnteni competed at the 1988 Summer Olympics for Niger. In his first match, he lost to the Dominican Republic's Melvin de Leon.

References

1967 births
Living people
Flyweight boxers
Nigerien male boxers
Olympic boxers of Niger
Boxers at the 1988 Summer Olympics